Simansky Log is a village in Strugo-Krasnensky District of Pskov Oblast, Russia.

Rural localities in Pskov Oblast